The First Kejriwal cabinet was the Council of Ministers in fifth Delhi Legislative Assembly headed by Chief Minister Arvind Kejriwal.

History
Kejriwal was then sworn in as 7th Chief Minister of Delhi on 28 December, leading the First Kejriwal cabinet, the youngest cabinet in Delhi ever. M. S. Dhir was elected as the speaker of the legislative assembly on 3 January 2014.

Amongst its first tasks, the AAP initiated a corruption response mechanism in a "durbar"; it also retracted the FDI in multi-brand retail that the previous government had sanctioned. Kejriwal said that though this would give consumers more options it has been shown that it "leads to loss of jobs to a very large extent. There is huge unemployment in Delhi and the AAP government does not wish to increase this unemployment. Delhi is not prepared for FDI." Yet he added that he was not against FDI by itself but that it needed to occur on a case-by-case basis.

Government resignation
After 49 days, Kejriwal resigned as a chief minister following the failure of the introduction of Delhi's Jan Lokpal Bill in the assembly on 14 February 2014. President's rule was then imposed and the assembly was kept in suspended animation. Fresh elections were scheduled for early 2015.

Cabinet Ministers

References

Cabinets established in 2013
2013 establishments in Delhi
Delhi cabinets
Kejriwal government
2014 disestablishments in India
Cabinets disestablished in 2014